The Coldwater River is a  stream in the U.S. state of Michigan. Located in western Michigan, the river is a part of the Grand River drainage basin.

The Coldwater River flows through Barry and Kent counties, and the drainage basin also includes a large portion of southwest Ionia County and a tiny portion of Sunfield Township in the northwest corner of Eaton County.

The Coldwater is formed from the Little Thornapple River in Carlton Township in Barry County.

Major tributaries (from the mouth):
Clarke and Bunker Drain (draining a complex of small lakes in Bowne Township
Tyler Creek (AKA Bear Creek), rises from the confluence of Pratt Lake Creek and Bear Creek in eastern Bowne Township
Walton Drain, rises in western Campbell Township in Ionia County
Bond Drain, rises in western Campbell Township in Ionia County
Pratt Lake Drain, rises from the outflow of Pratt Lake in southeast Lowell Township
Kilgus Branch, rises in southeast Lowell Township
Bear Creek, rises in southern Boston Township, just north of the village of Clarksville
Peddler Lake Drain, rises from the outflow of Peddler Lake in Campbell Township
Duck Creek, rises in northeast Odessa Township in Ionia County
Geieger Drain, rises in northeast Irving Township, just west of the village of Freeport, in Barry County
Stecklee Drain, a small drain on the east side of Freeport 
Bullhead Drain, rises in eastern Irving Township, south of Freeport
Bird Drain, rises in western Carlton Township in Barry County
Messer Brook, rises in southwest Odessa Township, just northwest of the village of Lake Odessa
Kart Creek, rises in eastern Campbell Township
Drainage from Lower Lake in south central Carlton Township
Little Thornapple River, rises from the outflow of Jordan Lake
Mallson Ditch/Drain, rising in northeast Carlton Township
Woodland Creek, rises near the village of Woodland in Woodland Township
Jordan Lake, on the boundary between Barry and Ionia counties
Tupper Lake, in Odessa Township, Ionia County
Tupper Creek, rises in western Sebewa Township in Ionia County

References

 , Coldwater River Watershed Council, 2002 (accessed 2007-04-08)
watershed map of the Coldwater watershed from the Michigan Department of Environmental Quality site (accessed 2006-12-19)

External links
Coldwater River Watershed Council, Barry, Eaton, Ionia, and Kent counties
Dolan Natural Area in Kent county, managed and owned by West Michigan Trout Unlimited 
Coldwater River Watershed Hydrologic Study, Dave Fongers, Hydrologic Studies Unit, Geological and Land Management Division, Michigan Department of Environmental Quality, October 24, 2003

Rivers of Michigan
Rivers of Barry County, Michigan
Rivers of Kent County, Michigan
Tributaries of Lake Michigan